A penumbral lunar eclipse will take place on December 11, 2038.

Visibility

Related lunar eclipses

Lunar year series (354 days)

See also 
List of lunar eclipses and List of 21st-century lunar eclipses

Notes

External links 
 

2038-12
2038-12
2038 in science